Moskovsky Guards Regiment was a Russian Imperial Guard infantry regiment. Established in October 1817 it continued in existence until the Russian Revolution of 1917.

History

Foundation 
The Moscow Guards Regiment was created on 12 October 1817. In order to constitute the new unit, the two senior battalions of the existing Litovski Regiment of line infantry were transferred to a senior corps of the Imperial Guard designated as the "Old Guard" (ru: старая гвардия). The Litovski itself had been raised on 7 November 1811 and this now became the nominal date of foundation for the Moscow Guards.

Campaigns 
 1812 - Battle of Borodino (as Litovski Regiment).
 1813 - Battle of Lützen, Battle of Bautzen, Battle of Dresden, Battle of Leipzig (as Litovski Regiment).
 1828–1829 — Russian-Turkish War
 1831 — Polish campaign.
 1863–1864 — Polish campaign.
 1877–1878 — Russo-Turkish War.
 1914–1917 — First World War.

Decembrist revolt 
On 25 December 1825 the Moscow Regiment played a leading role in the Decembrist revolt. Led by reform minded young officers the regiment paraded for most of a day in the Senate Square of Saint Petersburg, in protest against the accession of Tsar Nicholas I. At dusk they were fired on by loyalist artillery and routed. The officers involved were executed or exiled, and the ordinary soldiers transferred to line infantry units. However the Moscow Regiment, survived with its numbers restored by mass transferrals from the L.G. Grenadierski Regiment.

Uniforms and physical appearance 
Throughout its history under the Russian Empire, the regiment wore the standard uniform of the Infantry of the Imperial Guard, which from 1683 to 1914 was predominantly of a dark green (eventually verging on black) colour. The main distinctions of the Moscow Guards Regiment were the all-red facings (plastron, collar, cuffs and shoulder straps). On the collars were worn distinctive regimental patterns of braid (litzen) in gold or yellow braid. In 1912, in recognition of its service during the Russo-Tukish War, officers of the regiment were authorised to wear a large metal gorget of a design dating from 1808.

A peculiarity of the Russian Imperial Guard was that recruits for most regiments were required to meet certain criteria of physical appearance, in order to provide a standardised appearance on parade. For the Moscow Regiment conscripts were selected on the basis of their hair colour (red or reddish-brown).

References

Sources 
 Gorokhoff, Gerard. Russian Imperial Guard. 2002.
 Handbook of the Russian Army 1914 by the British General Staff. Battery Press reprint edition, 1996.

Russian Imperial Guard
Infantry regiments of the Russian Empire
Russian military units and formations of the Napoleonic Wars
Former guards regiments
Military units and formations established in 1812
Military units and formations disestablished in 1917
Guards regiments of the Russian Empire